CBH Compagnie Bancaire Helvétique SA (also, CBH Bank) was created in 1975 as a brokerage company known as stock and commodities services. In 1991, it obtained full banking license in Switzerland. The group currently employs approximately 260 employees. The current general manager is Philippe Cordonier. The bank is located in Geneva in the Canton of Geneva in Switzerland, and specialized in private banking and asset management.

The bank is owned by Benhamou family and keeps a special focus on developing banking relationships with UHNW clientele, mainly located in LATAM, Israel, Asia, Russia and Venezuela.

The family-owned CBH is one of Switzerland's smaller banks but has seen its assets under management more than quadruple, to $11.4 billion, since 2009 from $2 billion. Assets from clients located in Latin America and the Caribbean accounted for 19% of its business last year, according to financial records provided by the bank. - WSJ

History 
1975 – Creation of Stock and Commodity Services, a brokerage company, in Geneva
1991 – Swiss Banking license
1993 – Creation of 1618 SICAV family of Funds in Luxembourg
1993 – Opening of a representative office in St. Moritz
1995 – Opening of a fully licensed bank in Nassau, Bahamas
2002 – Acquisition of PG Partner Bank AG and creation of a branch in Zürich
2010 – Creation of a representative office in Tel Aviv, Israel
2012 – Opening of a subsidiary in London, United Kingdom and obtaining of an FSA regulated Investment management license
2014 – Acquisition of a major part of the Banque Privée Espirito Santo's Private Banking clientele
2016 – Acquisition of TTG (HK) Limited, an independent wealth management company established in Hong Kong
2017 – Acquisition of the Private Banking activities of FIBI Bank – Switzerland (First International Bank of Israel) based in Zürich
2018 - Acquisition of the Eastern European banking clientele of Schroeder & Co Bank AG part of Schroders Group
2020 – Acquisition of minority stake of 30% of FlowBank, an entirely digital bank based in Geneva

Corporate name, legal form and head office 
CBH Compagnie Bancaire Helvétique SA is the Group's umbrella company. The Bank is a company whose operations encompass all transactions that fall within the remit of an asset management bank with the status of securities trader. 
The bank has a branch in Zurich as well as representative offices in St. Moritz and Israel, and also operates via several subsidiaries based in the Bahamas, England, Hong Kong and Brasil. Together these entities form the corporate group CBH Compagnie Bancaire Helvétique.

Controversies and media

Reputation "clean up" with Eliminalia 

According to the story killers project, CBH Bank paid just under 229,000 euros to Eliminalia (a spanish reputation manager) — after hiring one of its partners, ReputationUp — to take down content linking it to offshore companies and money laundering charges.

U.S. Venezuela corruption investigation 
CBH Bank is related in Venezuela corruption cases but without strong evidence. US investigators, after obtaining bank reports, alleged that CBH Bank is being used to launder the proceeds of the fraud and the embezzlement scheme by figures in Venezuela, though CBH themselves is defrauded on the scheme. CBH stated they didn't know about any money laundering activities, and complied with all laws and regulations.

Switzerland’s financial regulator  reprimanded CBH Bank for failing to fight money laundering in servicing wealthy Venezuelan offshore clients. Swiss National Councillor Prisca Birrer-Heimo criticized CBH Bank's risk management demanding immediate regulation changes.

Kazakhstan corruption investigation 
Payments from Kazakh oligarchs lead to a complaint of suspected money laundering filed with the Swiss Financial Market Supervisory Authority Finma. A Geneva-based private bank is in the spotlight – not for the first time, Sonntagszeitung reports. The case concerns highly suspicious transactions  associated to a clan of Kazakh oligarch Akhmetzhan Yessimov.

Aliya Nazarbayeva, the youngest daughter of Nursultan Nazarbayev, the first President of Kazakhstan, holds 51% stake  at the CBH Bank. Ms Nazarbayeva had invested $108 million into a controlling stake in CBH Bank.

Florian Homm 
Absolute Capital Management (ACM), a hedge fund managed by Florian Homm, once reached a volume of up to three billion US dollars, but collapsed in 2007. Investors are said to have lost 200 million US dollars. Charged with investment fraud in the U.S., he disappeared in 2007. After his resignation, Florian Homm was accused by the remaining management of his company of having valued many of the assets much higher than their actual value. His wife withdrew money from CBH Bank accounts.

CBH Bahamas 
CBH's “serious error and negligence” resulted in fraudsters plundering more than $2m from one of its client’s accounts, Bahamas' Supreme Court revealed. Justice Ian Winder, in a May 12, 2022, ruling blasted CBH Bahamas for “failing to exercise the requisite due care and skill expected” when it failed to detect signs it was communicating with criminals.

Venezuela-Gold Ingots story 
In a story August 3, 2020, about a Venezuelan official allegedly hiding unexplained wealth by buying gold, The Associated Press erroneously reported some financial information about the Banco CBH. The bank's assets under management for clients located in Latin America and the Caribbean accounted for 19% of its business last year. AP corrected the story and specified that Banco CBH has no relationship with what was written in the wrong news.

References

External links
 CBH Annual Report 2019

Banks of Switzerland
Organisations based in Geneva
Family-owned companies